Frances Harriet Whipple Green McDougall (1805–1878) was an abolitionist, poet, novelist, editor, botanist, spiritualist medium, and advocate of women's, voters', and workers' rights.  In contrast to many other 19th-century women writers, throughout most of her adult life she earned her living as an author; at the same time she often donated her writing for causes she believed in, such as the abolition of slavery.

Early years
Frances Harriet Whipple was born on a farm in Smithfield, Rhode Island, in 1805. She descended from two of the state's oldest and most distinguished families. After her father went broke, she earned her own living at an early age.

Career
McDougall started her literary career by submitting poems to Providence newspapers. In 1829, she founded the literary periodical The Original as editor, catching the attention of critic John Neal, who praised her work in The Yankee, saying that "these are the things we should encourage" and wishing success "to all the she-magazines of our country". The Original ceased after two issues.

Some of her earliest writings were poems printed in the gazettes from 1830 to 1835. Her first volume was Memoirs of Eleanor Elbridge, a colored woman, of which there were sold more than 30,000 copies. In 1841, she published The Mechanic, a book addressed to the operatives of the country, which was much commended in Mr. Brownson's Boston Quarterly Review. In 1844, she published Might and Right, a history of the attempted revolution in Rhode Island, known as the Dorr Insurrection. During a part of the year 1842, she conducted The Wampanoag, a journal designed for the elevation of the laboring portion of the community, and thereafter, she was a large contributor to what were called "reform periodicals", particularly The Nineteenth Century, a quarterly miscellany, and The Univercoelum and Spiritual Philosopher, a paper "devoted to philosophico-theology, and an exposition and inculcation of the principles of Nature, in their application to individual and social life". In the autumn of 1848, she became editor of The Young People's Journal of Science, Literature, and Art, a monthly magazine printed in New York.

She gained local recognition for her poetry and in 1838 anonymously penned a best-seller: The Memoirs of Elleanor Eldridge. The profits of this book helped Eldridge retrieve property that had been taken from her unjustly.

In 1842, during the conflict of Rhode Island's Dorr Rebellion, McDougall supported Dorr's efforts to achieve reform of the state's voting laws. After this uprising was harshly suppressed, she fled to Connecticut where she lived "in exile" with her new husband, an artist named Charles Green. Their unhappy marriage ended in 1847 when Frances divorced Charles on grounds of non-support and desertion. She then moved to the area of New York City where she taught botany and wrote for spiritualist publications.

In 1861, she moved to San Francisco. There she lectured and wrote against slavery, worked for women's rights, and served on the board of the first local women's typographical union. She also continued her spiritualist writing. At the age of 57, she married William McDougall, a miner who had been a California assemblyman and was the brother of the state's second governor, John McDougall. She died in 1878 in Oakland, California, where she was buried in Mountain View Cemetery.

According to Griswold (1852), Green had perhaps entered more largely than any of her countrywomen into discussions of religion, philosophy, and polities. Her views were frequently original and ingenious, and they were nearly always stated with clearness and maintained with force of logic and felicity of illustration. A consideration of them would be more appropriate in a review of her prose-writings; their peculiarities were not disclosed in her poems, of which the only law was the sense of beauty.

Style and themes
Griswold (1852) remarked of Green's work thus:—

References

Citations

Sources

Attribution

External links
 Memoirs of Elleanor Eldridge. Providence, R. I.: B.T. Albro, 1838.

19th-century American women writers
1805 births
1878 deaths
19th-century American novelists
American women novelists
People from Smithfield, Rhode Island
Writers from Rhode Island